Sander Thomas (born 26 June 1997) is a Dutch professional footballer who last played for Go Ahead Eagles, as a forward.

References

1997 births
Living people
Dutch footballers
Netherlands youth international footballers
PEC Zwolle players
Heracles Almelo players
Go Ahead Eagles players
Eredivisie players
Eerste Divisie players
Association football forwards
Footballers from Enschede